The Amanzimtoti bombing took place on 23 December 1985 when five civilians were killed and 40 were injured when MK cadre Andrew Sibusiso Zondo detonated an explosive in a rubbish bin at a shopping centre.

Bombing
In the 1985 Amanzimtoti bombing on the Natal South Coast, five civilians were killed and 40 were injured when MK cadre Andrew Sibusiso Zondo detonated an explosive in a rubbish bin at a shopping centre shortly before Christmas. In a submission to the Truth and Reconciliation Commission (TRC), the ANC stated that Zondo's act, though "understandable" as a response to a recent South African Defence Force raid in Lesotho, was not in line with ANC policy. Zondo was subsequently executed.

See also
List of massacres in South Africa

References

Explosions in 1985
1985 in South Africa
Terrorist incidents in Africa in 1985
December 1985 events in Africa
1985 murders in South Africa
Terrorist incidents in South Africa in the 1980s